Statistics of Japan Soccer League for the 1986–87 season.

First Division
Despite moving to Kashiwa, Chiba and a soccer-specific stadium of their own, Hitachi did not adjust well and were relegated in bottom place, the first drop for the former champions. Matsushita, despite having more victories than relegation rivals Yamaha, had more losses as well and thus joined Hitachi.

Second Division
Sumitomo returned to the top flight at the first time of asking, followed by Toyota Motors, who had been struggling since their 1977 relegation and came close to dropping out of the League. TDK and the Kyoto Police Dept. team went back to the regional divisions; TDK would not return to the second tier until 2021.

First stage

East

West

Second stage

Promotion Group

Relegation Group

East

West

9th-16th Place Playoff

References
Japan - List of final tables (RSSSF)

Japan Soccer League seasons
1987 in Japanese football
1986 in Japanese football
Japan Soccer League